KZQD (105.1 FM, "Radio Libertad") is a radio station broadcasting a Spanish variety format. Licensed to Liberal, Kansas, United States, the station serves the Southwest Kansas area. The station is currently owned by Mario Loredo.

History
The Federal Communications Commission issued a construction permit for the station on August 13, 1991. The station was assigned the KZQD call sign on October 4, 1991, and received its license to cover on January 30, 1998.

References

External links

ZQD
Regional Mexican radio stations in the United States
Radio stations established in 1998
Liberal, Kansas
ZQD